Henry of Winchester was the nickname of:

 Henry III of England (1207-1272)
 Henry of Blois (1101–1171), abbot of Glastonbury Abbey and bishop of Winchester